Results of the 2008-09 Manchester Phoenix Season:

Season standings

Game log

September
Record for month: 6–1–1 (home: 3–1–0; away: 3–0–1).

October
Record for month: 6–2–0 (home: 3–1–0; away: 3–1–0).

November
Record for month: 4–5–0 (home: 2–3–0; away: 2–2–0).

December
Record for month: 5–3-1 (home: 3–1–0; away 2–2–1).

January
Record for month: 3–6–1 (home: 3–2–0; away 0–4–1).

February
Record for month: 7–3–0 (home: 3–2–0; away: 4–1–0).

March
Record for month: 6–8–1 (home: 4–2–1; away 2–6–0).

Green background indicates win.
Red background indicates regulation loss.
White background indicates overtime/shootout loss.

Roster 

Goaltenders:

•
•

Defensemen

•
•
•
•
•
•

Forwards

•
•
•
•
•
•
•
•
•
•
•

Player stats

Scoring leaders

Note: GP = Games played; G = Goals; A = Assists; Pts = Total Points; PIM = Penalty Minutes

Transactions

Free agents acquired

Free agents lost

Awards and records
 Runner Up 2008/09 Knockout Cup
 Runner Up 2008/09 Challenge Cup
 Elite League Player of the Year - David-Alexandre Beauregard
 Best British Netminder - Stephen Murphy
 Best British Forward - Tony Hand
 David-Alexandre Beauregard - EIHL First Team All Star
 Tony Hand - EIHL Second Team All Star
 'Man of Ice' Awards - 'Fans Favourite' - David-Alexandre Beauregard
 'Man of Ice' Awards - 'Forward of the Year' - David-Alexandre Beauregard
 'Man of Ice' Awards - 'Hard As Ice' - Brett Clouthier
 'Man of Ice' Awards - 'Best Newcomer' - David-Alexandre Beauregard
 'Man of Ice' Awards - 'Player of the Year' - David-Alexandre Beauregard
 'Man of Ice' Awards - 'Outstanding Achievement' - Tony Hand
 'Man of Ice' Awards - '4000 Points Total' - Tony Hand

External links
Official site of the Manchester Phoenix

References

Game Log:  on ManchesterPhoenix.co.uk
Player Stats Player Stats, 2008/09, Hockey DB

Man
Manchester Phoenix seasons